Dawsonville is a railway town and junction in Kenya, lying on the main line to Uganda and the branches to Kisumu and Solai.

See also 

 Railway stations in Kenya

Statistics 
 Elevation = 1984m
 Population = 49,675

References 

Populated places in Nakuru County